Uneasy is a collaborative album by jazz musicians Vijay Iyer, Linda May Han Oh, and Tyshawn Sorey. It was released on April 9, 2021 through ECM Records.

Critical reception

Uneasy was acclaimed by music critics. On Metacritic, it holds a score of 85 out of 100, indicating "universal acclaim", based on six reviews.

Accolades

Track listing

References

2021 albums
ECM Records albums
Free jazz albums